Roll on Summer is an EP by Australian artist Paul Kelly and originally released in October, 2000. It was released on EMI in Australia. The track "Every Fucking City" was recorded live at The Continental, 25 November 1999.  The EP peaked at No. 40 on the ARIA singles charts.

Track listing
All songs were written by Paul Kelly, except where noted.
 "You're So Fine" (Paul Kelly, Peter Luscombe) – 3:28
 "Roll on Summer" – 3:13
 "I Was Hoping You'd Say That" – 2:42
 "Every Fucking City" – 3:35

Personnel
 Paul Kelly  – vocals
 Kirsty Stegwazi – vocals ("Roll on Summer")
 Madeleine Kelly – vocals ("Roll on Summer")
 Memphis Kelly – vocals ("Roll on Summer")

Charts

References

External links
 "Roll on Summer" lyrics

2000 EPs
Paul Kelly (Australian musician) albums